The 2016–17 New York Knicks season was the 71st season of the franchise in the National Basketball Association (NBA). On June 2, 2016, the Knicks announced Jeff Hornacek as their new head coach.

The off-season dominated with the acquisitions of former Chicago Bulls players Derrick Rose and Joakim Noah.

Following the season, Phil Jackson left as team president, Derrick Rose signed as a free agent with the Cleveland Cavaliers, and Carmelo Anthony was traded to the Oklahoma City Thunder.

Draft

The Knicks did not have a pick in the 2016 NBA Draft.

Roster

Standings

Division

Conference

Game log

Pre-season

|- style="background:#fcc
| 1 
| October 4
| @ Rockets
| 
| Kristaps Porzingis (22)
| Kyle O'Quinn (9)
| Derrick Rose (5)
| Toyota Center14,397
| 0–1
|- style="background:#cfc
| 2 
| October 8
| Nets
| 
| Carmelo Anthony (16)
| Kristaps Porzingis (6)
| Brandon Jennings (5)
| Madison Square Garden19,601
| 1–1
|- style="background:#cfc
| 3 
| October 10
| Wizards
| 
| Carmelo Anthony (19)
| Kristaps Porzingis (6)
| Hernangomez, Lee (3)
| Madison Square Garden19,033
| 2–1
|- style="background:#fcc
| 4 
| October 15
| Celtics
| 
| Mindaugas Kuzminskas (18)
| Willy Hernangomez (12)
| Holiday, Jennings (5)
| Madison Square Garden19,607
| 2–2
|- style="background:#cfc;"
| 5 
| October 19
| @ Celtics
| 
| Kristaps Porzingis (20)
| Joakim Noah (7)
| Ron Baker (5)
| TD Garden16,327
| 3–2
|- style="background:#cfc;"
| 6 
| October 20
| @ Nets
| 
| Carmelo Anthony (21)
| Kyle O'Quinn (7)
| Brandon Jennings (6)
| Barclays Center17,732
| 4–2

Regular season

|- style="background:#fcc;"
| 1
| October 25
| @ Cleveland
| 
| Carmelo Anthony (19)
| Kristaps Porzingis (7)
| Brandon Jennings (5)
| Quicken Loans Arena20,562
| 0–1
|- style="background:#cfc;"
| 2
| October 29
| Memphis
| 
| Carmelo Anthony (20)
| Joakim Noah (10)
| Joakim Noah (7)
| Madison Square Garden19,812
| 1–1

|- style="background:#fcc;"
| 3
| November 1
| @ Detroit
| 
| Carmelo Anthony (24)
| Joakim Noah (11)
| Joakim Noah (8)
| Palace of Auburn Hills13,087
| 1–2
|- style="background:#fcc;"
| 4
| November 2
| Houston
| 
| Carmelo Anthony (21)
| Kristaps Porzingis (8)
| Noah, Rose (4)
| Madison Square Garden19,812
| 1–3
|- style="background:#cfc"
| 5
| November 4
| @ Chicago
| 
| Kristaps Porzingis (27)
| Joakim Noah (9)
| Derrick Rose (11)
| United Center22,376
| 2–3
|- style="background:#fcc"
| 6
| November 6
| Utah
| 
| Porzingis, Anthony (28)
| Carmelo Anthony (9)
| Derrick Rose (8)
| Madison Square Garden19,812
| 2–4
|- style="background:#cfc"
| 7
| November 9
| Brooklyn
| 
| Carmelo Anthony (22)
| Kristaps Porzingis (8)
| Brandon Jennings (11)
| Madison Square Garden19,812
| 3–4
|- style="background:#fcc"
| 8
| November 11
| @ Boston
| 
| Kristaps Porzingis (14)
| Willy Hernangomez (12)
| Derrick Rose (6)
| TD Garden18,624
| 3–5
|- style="background:#fcc"
| 9
| November 12
| @ Toronto
| 
| Carmelo Anthony (31)
| Joakim Noah (18)
| Brandon Jennings (5)
| Air Canada Centre19,800
| 3–6
|- style="background:#cfc"
| 10
| November 14
| Dallas
| 
| Anthony, Porzingis (24)
| Kristaps Porzingis (11)
| Derrick Rose (5)
| Madison Square Garden19,812
| 4–6
|- style="background:#cfc"
| 11
| November 16
| Detroit
| 
| Kristaps Porzingis (35)
| Joakim Noah (15)
| Brandon Jennings (7)
| Madison Square Garden19,812
| 5–6
|- style="background:#fcc"
| 12
| November 17
| @ Washington
| 
| Derrick Rose (24)
| Noah, Porzingis (7)
| Brandon Jennings (10)
| Verizon Center16,704
| 5–7
|-style="background:#cfc"
| 13
| November 20
| Atlanta
| 
| Carmelo Anthony (31)
| Kristaps Porzingis (11)
| Derrick Rose (7) 
| Madison Square Garden19,812
| 6–7
|-style="background:#cfc"
| 14
| November 22
| Portland
| 
| Kristaps Porzingis (31)
| Kristaps Porzingis (9)
| Brandon Jennings (11)
| Madison Square Garden19,120
| 7–7
|-style="background:#cfc"
| 15
| November 25
| Charlotte
| 
| Carmelo Anthony (35)
| Carmelo Anthony (14)
| Anthony, Rose (5)
| Madison Square Garden19,812
| 8–7
|-style="background:#fcc"
| 16
| November 26
| @ Charlotte
| 
| Kristaps Porzingis (25)
| Anthony, Rose (8)
| Derrick Rose (8)
| Time Warner Cable Arena19,195
| 8–8
|-style="background:#fcc"
| 17
| November 28
| Oklahoma City
| 
| Derrick Rose (30)
| Carmelo Anthony (8)
| Noah, Rose (4)
| Madison Square Garden19,812
| 8–9
|-style="background:#cfc"
| 18
| November 30
| @ Minnesota
| 
| Kristaps Porzingis (29)
| Kyle O'Quinn (8)
| Brandon Jennings (7)
| Target Center13,987
| 9–9

|-style="background:#cfc"
| 19
| December 2
| Minnesota
| 
| Carmelo Anthony (29)
| Kyle O'Quinn (13)
| Brandon Jennings (8) 
| Madison Square Garden19,812
| 10–9
|-style="background:#cfc"
| 20
| December 4
| Sacramento
| 
| Anthony, Rose (20)
| Kristaps Porzingis (14)
| Derrick Rose (6) 
| Madison Square Garden19,812
| 11–9
|- style="background:#cfc"
| 21
| December 6
| @ Miami
| 
| Carmelo Anthony (35)
| Kristaps Porzingis (12)
| Brandon Jennings (9)
| American Airlines Arena19,610
| 12–9
|- style="background:#fcc;"
| 22
| December 7
| Cleveland
| 
| Brandon Jennings (16)
| O'Quinn, Hernangomez (7)
| Courtney Lee (5)
| Madison Square Garden 19,812
| 12–10
|- style="background:#cfc;"
| 23
| December 9
| @ Sacramento
| 
| Carmelo Anthony (33)
| Kristaps Porzingis (10)
| Brandon Jennings (7)
| Golden 1 Center17,608
| 13−10
|- style="background:#cfc;"
| 24
| December 11
| @ L. A. Lakers
| 
| Kristaps Porzingis (26)
| Porzingis, Hernangomez (12)
| Carmelo Anthony (7)
| Staples Center18,997
| 14–10
|- style="background:#fcc;"
| 25 
| December 13
| @ Phoenix
| 
| Kristaps Porzingis (34)
| Kyle O'Quinn (14)
| Anthony, Jennings (5)
| Talking Stick Resort Arena16,429
| 14–11
|- style="background:#fcc;"
| 26
| December 15
| @ Golden State
| 
| Justin Holiday (15)
| Noah, Hernangomez (10)
| Brandon Jennings (6)
| Oracle Arena 19,596
| 14–12
|- style="background:#fcc;"
| 27
| December 17
| @ Denver
| 
| Carmelo Anthony (29)
| Willy Hernangomez (10)
| Brandon Jennings (7)
| Pepsi Center12,042
| 14–13
|- style="background:#cfc;"
| 28
| December 20
| Indiana
| 
| Carmelo Anthony (35)
| Joakim Noah (11)
| Derrick Rose (6)
| Madison Square Garden19,812
| 15–13
|- style="background:#cfc;"
| 29
| December 22
| Orlando
| 
| Derrick Rose (19)
| Kyle O'Quinn (16)
| Brandon Jennings (12)
| Madison Square Garden19,812
| 16–13
|- style="background:#fcc;"
| 30
| December 25
| Boston
| 
| Carmelo Anthony (29)
| Porzingis, Noah (12)
| Derrick Rose (3)
| Madison Square Garden19,812
| 16–14
|- style="background:#fcc;"
| 31
| December 28
| @ Atlanta
| 
| Derrick Rose (26)
| Joakim Noah (16)
| Derrick Rose (6)
| Philips Arena15,093
| 16–15
|- style="background:#fcc;"
| 32
| December 30
| @ New Orleans
| 
| Carmelo Anthony (26)
| Carmelo Anthony (13)
| Anthony, Noah, Rose (4)
| Smoothie King Center18,124
| 16–16
|- style="background:#fcc;"
| 33
| December 31
| @ Houston
|  
| Brandon Jennings (32)
| Joakim Noah (16)
| Rose, Jennings (7)
| Toyota Center18,055
| 16–17

|- style="background:#fcc;"
| 34
| January 2
| Orlando
| 
| Carmelo Anthony (19)
| Joakim Noah (10)
| Rose, Jennings (4)
| Madison Square Garden19,812
| 16–18
|- style="background:#fcc;"
| 35
| January 4
| Milwaukee
| 
| Carmelo Anthony (30)
| Joakim Noah (16)
| Carmelo Anthony (7)
| Madison Square Garden19,812
| 16–19
|- style="background:#cfc;"
| 36
| January 6
| @ Milwaukee
| 
| Carmelo Anthony (26)
| Joakim Noah (9)
| Carmelo Anthony (10)
| BMO Harris Bradley Center18,717
| 17–19
|- style="background:#fcc;"
| 37
| January 7
| @ Indiana
| 
| Anthony, Jennings (17)
| Joakim Noah (6)
| Carmelo Anthony (5)
| Bankers Life Fieldhouse17,367
| 17–20
|- style="background:#fcc;"
| 38
| January 9
| New Orleans
| 
| Brandon Jennings (20)
| Joakim Noah (6)
| Jennings, Baker (4)
| Madison Square Garden19,812
| 17–21
|- style="background:#fcc;"
| 39
| January 11
| @ Philadelphia
| 
| Carmelo Anthony (28)
| Kyle O'Quinn (15)
| Lee, Rose (4)
| Wells Fargo Center18,755
| 17–22
|- style="background:#cfc"
| 40
| January 12
| Chicago
| 
| Carmelo Anthony (23)
| Joakim Noah (12)
| Carmelo Anthony (6)
| Madison Square Garden19,812
| 18–22
|- style="background:#fcc"
| 41
| January 15
| @ Toronto
| 
| Carmelo Anthony (18)
| Willy Hernangomez (13)
| Brandon Jennings (7)
| Air Canada Centre19,800
| 18–23
|- style="background:#fcc"
| 42
| January 16
| Atlanta
| 
| Carmelo Anthony (30)
| Joakim Noah (17)
| Derrick Rose (9)
| Madison Square Garden19,812
| 18–24
|-style="background:#cfc"
| 43
| January 18
| @ Boston
| 
| Derrick Rose (30)
| Willy Hernangomez (11)
| Derrick Rose (5)
| TD Garden18,624
| 19–24
|- style="background:#fcc"
| 44
| January 19
| Washington
| 
| Carmelo Anthony (34)
| Carmelo Anthony (10)
| Brandon Jennings (5)
| Madison Square Garden19,812
| 19–25
|- style="background:#fcc"
| 45
| January 21
| Phoenix
| 
| Carmelo Anthony (31)
| Joakim Noah (15)
| Carmelo Anthony (6)
| Madison Square Garden19,812
| 19–26
|- style="background:#cfc;"
| 46
| January 23
| @ Indiana
| 
| Carmelo Anthony (26)
| Willy Hernangomez (10)
| Derrick Rose (6)
| Bankers Life Fieldhouse16,015
| 20–26
|- style="background:#fcc;"
| 47
| January 25
| @ Dallas
| 
| Carmelo Anthony (30)
| Willy Hernangomez (16)
| Anthony, Rose, Jennings (4)
| American Airlines Center19,750
| 20–27
|-style="background:#cfc;"
| 48
| January 27
| Charlotte
| 
| Anthony, Porzingis (18)
| Carmelo Anthony (11)
| Lee, Rose (8)
| Madison Square Garden19,812
| 21–27
|- style="background:#fcc;"
| 49
| January 29
| @ Atlanta
| 
| Carmelo Anthony (45)
| Joakim Noah (14)
| Brandon Jennings (11)
| Philips Arena13,643
| 21–28
|- style="background:#fcc;"
| 50
| January 31
| @ Washington
| 
| Carmelo Anthony (26)
| Willy Hernangomez (14)
| Willy Hernangomez (4)
| Verizon Center16,683
| 21–29

|- style="background:#cfc;"
| 51
| February 1
| @ Brooklyn
| 
| Kristaps Porzingis (19)
| Kristaps Porzingis (12)
| Brandon Jennings (10)
| Barclays Center17,732
| 22–29
|- style="background:#fcc;"
| 52
| February 4
| Cleveland
| 
| Brandon Jennings (23)
| Kristaps Porzingis (8)
| Brandon Jennings (10)
| Madison Square Garden19,812
| 22–30
|- style="background:#fcc;"
| 53
| February 6
| L. A. Lakers
| 
| Carmelo Anthony (26)
| Willy Hernangomez (13)
| Anthony, Jennings (5)
| Madison Square Garden19,812
| 22–31
|- style=background:#fcc;"
| 54
| February 8
| L. A. Clippers
| 
| Carmelo Anthony (28)
| Anthony, Hernangomez (9)
| Derrick Rose (8)
| Madison Square Garden19,812
| 22–32
|- style=background:#fcc;"
| 55
| February 10
| Denver
| 
| Carmelo Anthony (31)
| Anthony, O'Quinn (6)
| Brandon Jennings (13)
| Madison Square Garden19,812 
| 22–33
|- style=background:#cfc;"
| 56
| February 12
| San Antonio
| 
| Carmelo Anthony (25)
| Willy Hernangómez (9)
| Courtney Lee (5)
| Madison Square Garden19,812 
| 23–33
|- style=background:#fcc;
| 57
| February 15
| @ Oklahoma City
| 
| Derrick Rose (25)
| Willy Hernangomez (10)
| Derrick Rose (7)
| Chesapeake Energy Arena18,203
| 23–34
|- style= "background:#fcc;"
| 58
| February 23
| @ Cleveland
| 
| Courtney Lee (25)
| Hernangomez, Quinn (10)
| Lee, Anthony (5)
| Quicken Loans Arena 20,562
| 23–35
|- style="background:#cfc;"
| 59
| February 25
| Philadelphia
| 
| Carmelo Anthony (37)
| Willy Hernangómez (9)
| Kyle O'Quinn (5)
| Madison Square Garden19,812
| 24–35
|- style="background:#fcc;"
| 60
| February 27
| Toronto
| 
| Carmelo Anthony (24)
| Willy Hernangómez (9)
| Rose, Quinn (4)
| Madison Square Garden19,800
| 24–36

|- style="background:#cfc;"
| 61
| March 1
| @ Orlando
| 
| Kristaps Porzingis (20)
| Anthony, Porzingis (9)
| Rose, Quinn, Baker (4)
| Amway Center16,005
| 25–36
|- style="background:#fcc;"
| 62
| March 3
| @ Philadelphia
| 
| Lance Thomas (21)
| Thomas, Porzingis (7)
| Derrick Rose (5)
| Wells Fargo Center 18,518
| 25–37
|- style="background:#fcc;"
| 63
| March 5
| Golden State
| 
| Derrick Rose (24)
| Kristaps Porzingis (15)
| Kyle O'Quinn (5)
| Madison Square Garden19,812
| 25–38
|- style="background:#cfc;"
| 64
| March 6
| @ Orlando
| 
| Courtney Lee (20)
| Quinn, Hernangómez (9)
| Derrick Rose (6)
| Amway Center16,046
| 26–38
|- style="background:#fcc;"
| 65
| March 8
| @ Milwaukee
| 
| Derrick Rose (26)
| Willy Hernangómez (12)
| Derrick Rose (6)
| Bradley Center13,767
| 26–39
|- style="background:#fcc;"
| 66
| March 11
| @ Detroit
| 
| Kristaps Porzingis (18)
| Willy Hernangómez (9)
| Courtney Lee (5)
| The Palace of Auburn Hills19,607
| 26–40
|- style="background:#fcc;"
| 67
| March 12
| @ Brooklyn
| 
| Carmelo Anthony (27)
| Hernangómez, Porzingis (10)
| Thomas, Porzingis (7)
| Barclays Center17,732
| 26–41
|- style="background:#cfc;"
| 68
| March 14
| Indiana
| 
| Carmelo Anthony (22)
| Willy Hernangómez (16)
| Hernangómez, Rose (4)
| Madison Square Garden18,261
| 27–41
|- style="background:#fcc;"
| 69
| March 16
| Brooklyn
| 
| Derrick Rose (22)
| Lance Thomas (10)
| Carmelo Anthony (5)
| Madison Square Garden19,812
| 27–42
|- style=background:#fcc;"
| 70
| March 20
| @ L. A. Clippers
| 
| Porzingis, Rose (18)
| Kristaps Porzingis (11)
| Derrick Rose (5)
| Staples Center19,060
| 27–43
|- style=background:#fcc;"
| 71
| March 22
| @ Utah
| 
| Kristaps Porzingis (24)
| Lance Thomas (9)
| Derrick Rose (6)
| Vivint Smart Home Arena19,911
| 27–44
|- style="background:#fcc;"
| 72
| March 23
| @ Portland
| 
| Kristaps Porzingis (18)
| Kristaps Porzingis (9)
| Lee, Baker (4)
| Moda Center19,020 
| 27–45
|- style="background:#fcc;"
| 73
| March 25
| @ San Antonio
| 
| Hernangómez, Rose (24)
| Willy Hernangómez (13)
| Courtney Lee (7)
| AT&T Center18,418
| 27–46
|- style="background:#cfc;"
| 74
| March 27
| Detroit
| 
| Derrick Rose (27)
| Kristaps Porzingis (8)
| Derrick Rose (6)
| Madison Square Garden19,812
| 28–46
|- style="background:#fcc;"
| 75
| March 29
| Miami
| 
| Kristaps Porzingis (20)
| Willy Hernangómez (9)
| Baker, Holiday, Randle (3)
| Madison Square Garden19,812
| 28–47
|- style="background:#cfc;"
| 76
| March 31
| @ Miami
| 
| Kristaps Porzingis (22)
| Willy Hernangómez (12)
| Sasha Vujacic (7)
| AmericanAirlines Arena19,600
| 29–47

|-style="background:#fcc;"
| 77
| April 2
| Boston
| 
| Courtney Lee (16)
| Kyle O'Quinn (9)
| Courtney Lee (5)
| Madison Square Garden19,812
| 29–48
|-style="background:#cfc;"
| 78
| April 4
| Chicago
| 
| Carmelo Anthony (23)
| Ndour, Quinn (12)
| Ron Baker (6)
| Madison Square Garden19,812
| 30–48
|-style="background:#fcc;"
| 79
| April 6
| Washington
| 
| Carmelo Anthony (23)
| Hernangomez, Lee (8)
| Carmelo Anthony (4)
| Madison Square Garden19,812
| 30–49
|- style="background:#fcc;"
| 80
| April 7
| @ Memphis
| 
| Courtney Lee (16)
| Willy Hernangomez (10)
| Ron Baker (7)
| FedExForum17,631
| 30–50
|- style="background:#fcc;"
| 81
| April 9
| Toronto
| 
| Willy Hernangomez (24)
| Willy Hernangomez (11)
| Ron Baker (8)
| Madison Square Garden19,812
| 30–51
|- style="background:#cfc"
| 82
| April 12
| Philadelphia
| 
| Justin Holiday (20)
| Marshall Plumlee (11)
| Sasha Vujacic (6)
| Madison Square Garden19,812
| 31–51

Transactions

Trades

Free agency

Re-signed

Additions

Subtractions

References

New York Knicks seasons
New York Knicks
New York Knicks
New York Knicks
2010s in Manhattan
Madison Square Garden